The women's 100 metre backstroke event at the 1972 Olympic Games took place between September 1 and 2. This swimming event used backstroke.  Because an Olympic-size swimming pool is 50 metres long, this race consisted of two lengths of the pool.

Medalists

Results

Heats
Heat 1

Heat 2

Heat 3

Heat 4

Heat 5

Semifinals

Final

Key: OR = Olympic record

References

Women's backstroke 100 metre
1972 in women's swimming
Women's events at the 1972 Summer Olympics